Walter Bell  is an American businessman and former government official who served as Alabama Commissioner of Insurance from 2003 to 2008.

Early life and education 
Bell was born in Vredenburgh, Alabama, and moved to Mobile, Alabama as a child. Bell graduated from Spring Hill College in 1983.

Career 
From 1979 to 1983, Bell worked as a branch manager at the First National Bank of Mobile. From 1983 to 2003, he served as vice president of the Mutual Life Insurance Company of New York.

Bell was nominated to serve as Alabama Commissioner of Insurance by governor Bob Riley in 2003. After resigning as Insurance Commissioner, Bell served as Chairman of Swiss Re America Holding Corporation from 2008 to 2012. Bell serves on the board of directors of the Bermuda Monetary Authority, and is a commissioner of the Mobile Area Water and Sewer System. Bell is the first international board member of the Bermuda Monetary Authority. He is also a board member of the Mobile Regional Airport.

Personal life 
Bell was married to Loresa C. Bell until her death on August 18, 2018. Bell has two children, including comedian and television host W. Kamau Bell.

References

External links
Walter Bell, Swiss Re at Climate Week NYC 2012

African-American business executives
Living people
Businesspeople from Alabama
20th-century American businesspeople
21st-century American businesspeople
Year of birth missing (living people)
Spring Hill College alumni
People from Mobile, Alabama
20th-century African-American people
21st-century African-American people